Lost City of Z is a fabled lost city in the Amazon.

Lost City of Z may also refer to:
 The Lost City of Z (book), a 2005 New Yorker article and 2009 book by David Grann
 The Lost City of Z (film), a 2016 film directed by James Gray

See also
The Lost City of D, an American film scheduled for release in 2022